WBHY-FM (88.5 FM, "Power 88") is a radio station licensed to serve Mobile, Alabama, United States. The station is owned by Goforth Media, Inc. It airs a Contemporary Christian music format.

The station was assigned the WBHY-FM call letters by the Federal Communications Commission on April 15, 1991.

Plans have been in the works since December 2000 to increase power to 100 kW, as soon as the funds are available for the upgrade. The station was finally granted a construction permit for 100 kW in late March 2017.  (Taken from Alabama Broadcast Media Page)

References

External links
 WBHY-FM official website
 
 
 

BHY-FM
Contemporary Christian radio stations in the United States
Radio stations established in 1992
Mass media in Baldwin County, Alabama
BHY-FM